Yates Racing was an American stock car racing team that competed in NASCAR through the 2009 season, after which it merged into Richard Petty Motorsports. Previously known as Robert Yates Racing, the team was owned by Doug Yates, who has officially owned the team since his father Robert's retirement on December 1, 2007. The Yates family owned the team since purchasing it from Harry Ranier and J. T. Lundy in October 1988.

The team was noted for its strong engine program and its success on superspeedways.  Throughout most of its history, the team fielded Ford cars numbered 28, 38 and 88, although in its final season it fielded the number 98.

Cup Series

Car No. 28 history 

Davey Allison (1989-1993)
After purchasing the assets of Ranier-Lundy Racing in October 1988, Robert Yates' first driver was Davey Allison, who had driven for the Ranier-Lundy banner since 1987 (his rookie season), and drove the No. 28 Havoline-sponsored Ford from Yates' takeover of the team until mid-1993, racking up 15 wins and twice finishing 3rd in points. He was tragically killed in a helicopter crash at Talladega Superspeedway in July 1993.

Ernie Irvan (1993-1994)
After Allison's death Robby Gordon drove at Talladega later in July and Lake Speed drove in the next three races. Ernie Irvan was then brought over from Morgan-McClure Motorsports to become Allison's permanent replacement. Irvan took over on Labor Day weekend at Darlington, winning at Charlotte and Martinsville before the season concluded.

In 1994, tragedy again struck the #28 team. After winning three races, Irvan crashed heavily in a practice session at Michigan and suffered life-threatening injuries. He would not race again in 1994 and it was uncertain whether he would ever return to racing. In the meantime, Kenny Wallace was brought in to take over the Havoline Ford for the remainder of the 1994 season.

Dale Jarrett (1995)
Needing a full-time driver for the 1995 season due to the uncertainty surrounding Irvan's recovery, Yates signed Dale Jarrett away from Joe Gibbs Racing to replace him for the 1995 season. Jarrett won one race at Pocono Raceway and eventually finished the season 13th in the points standings. Irvan would eventually return for three races driving a second car numbered 88 for Yates.

Ernie Irvan (1996-1997)
Irvan returned to the #28 in 1996 and won at New Hampshire. Irvan won at Michigan in June 1997, the same track he almost died on three years earlier. Irvan left at the end of the 1997 season to drive for MB2 Motorsports.

Kenny Irwin Jr. (1998-1999)
Kenny Irwin Jr. drove the No. 28 car for Robert Yates in 1998 and 1999. Despite winning Rookie of the Year honors in 1998, Irwin failed to find victory lane in his two seasons.

Ricky Rudd (2000-2002)
The next season, Ricky Rudd joined the team after his own Rudd Performance Motorsports team was sold. He would go on to drive 3 seasons in the Havoline-sponsored Ford, from 2000 to 2002, and won his first race for the team in 2001 at Pocono in June after going winless since 1998. Rudd drove the No. 28 to Victory Lane two additional times, the September Richmond race in 2001 and his final victory at Infineon in June 2002,  and finished in the top ten in the standings all 3 seasons, including 4th in 2001, his 2nd highest career points finish. Rudd left the team to join Wood Brothers Racing in 2003, while Yates hired the Wood's previous driver, Elliott Sadler and Robert Yates switched from No. 28 to No. 38 along with sponsorship from Mars, Inc.

Travis Kvapil (2008-2009)
Robert Yates would resurrect the 28 for the 2008 season, however. Yates made the switch after giving the rights to the No. 88 to Hendrick Motorsports for Dale Earnhardt Jr. Travis Kvapil would take over driving duties after Ricky Rudd's departure at the end of 2007. Before the season started, he, along with his teammate, David Gilliland, did not have full-time sponsorship on either of their Yates Racing Fords. However, for the Daytona 500, K&N Filters sponsored his team. Two weeks later, at Las Vegas Motor Speedway, during the UAW-Dodge 400, Kvapil scored an eighth-place finish, giving him his third top-10 of his career, in an unsponsored ride. Later that week, Zaxby's decided to sponsor the No. 28 team for the next race, which was the Kobalt Tools 500 at Atlanta Motor Speedway. A couple of races later, in the Aaron's 499, he finished in the sixth position with a one race sponsorship deal from Northern Tool and Equipment, which gave him his career best finish in the Cup Series. Just a few weeks after his career best run, Kvapil picked up another top-10 finish, this time at Darlington Raceway, during the Dodge Challenger 500. Despite the lack of a full-time sponsorship, Travis Kvapil and the No. 28 had a very respectable season, finishing 23rd in the points standings and a pole at Talladega in October.

For 2009, Kvapil's owner points from 2008 were transferred to the No. 98, given that Paul Menard had signed with the team, therefore bringing with him a full-time Menard's sponsorship. The future of the No. 28 team was uncertain without a sponsor, and Yates would only field the car for five races unless sponsorship had been found. Despite failing to qualify for the Shelby 427, Kvapil had two 18th-place finishes in five races, with race by race sponsorship from Golden Corral and Farmers Insurance. Unfortunately, the team still lacked a committed full-time sponsor, and Yates shut down the No. 28 following the Food City 500.

Car No. 28 results

Car No. 38 history 
Elliott Sadler (2003-2006)

Elliott Sadler was hired in 2003, and Yates brought in M&M's as the sponsor, replacing the longtime sponsor Havoline. Yates also changed the car's number from 28 to 38. Sadler collected two victories for the team, and finished a career-best 9th in points in 2004. On August 14, 2006, Sadler left for Evernham Motorsports to drive the No. 19.

David Gilliland (2006-2008)
David Gilliland replaced Sadler in the No. 38, beginning with the GFS Marketplace 400 at Michigan. He finished out the 2006 season, and continued to drive the No. 38 in 2007, after which M&M's left the team for Joe Gibbs Racing's No. 18 car. Gilliland drove for Yates again in 2008 and on May 9, it was announced that FreeCreditReport.com would sponsor the car for the remainder of the 2008 season. Later in the year, Gilliland would record his best career finish of second at Infineon Raceway, and finished 27th in the points standings.

The No. 38's owner points were sold to Hall of Fame Racing to field the No. 96, but Yates switched the No. 28's owners points to the 98. After the team was unable to find sponsorship, Gilliland was released from his contract. Gilliland later went on to TRG Motorsports for some races in 2009.

Car No. 38 results

Car No. 88 history 

Ernie Irvan (1995)
The No. 88 team began racing for RYR in 1995 with Havoline as the primary sponsor, as Ernie Irvan drove the car in 3 races following his comeback from injuries.

Dale Jarrett (1996-2006)
Irvan returned to the No. 28 the following year, and Dale Jarrett began driving the No. 88 in 1996 with sponsorship from Ford Quality Care and Ford Credit. Jarrett won the 1996 Daytona 500 in his first race in the No. 88, defeating Dale Earnhardt for the second time in four years. Jarrett went on to win the Coca-Cola 600 at Charlotte in May, the Brickyard 400, and Michigan in August. Jarrett finished third in the Winston Cup point standings behind Hendrick Motorsports teammates Terry Labonte (the Champion) and Jeff Gordon. In 1997 Jarrett won at Atlanta and Darlington in March, Pocono in July, Bristol in August, Charlotte in October, and Phoenix in November.

Over the years, Jarrett collected 29 victories (the most wins for any driver for RYR) and he won the Winston Cup championship in 1999. He also finished in the top 10 in points 7 consecutive seasons from 1996 through 2002. The sponsorship on the No. 88 car changed from Ford Quality Care to UPS in 2001.  Jarrett and sponsor UPS left RYR at the end of the 2006 season for Michael Waltrip Racing.

Ricky Rudd (2007)
Despite off-season rumors of the No. 88 being shut down and becoming a one-car team, Ricky Rudd returned to RYR, this time in the No. 88 with sponsorship from Snickers. Rudd officially announced his retirement from racing on August 20. On September 14, 2007, it was revealed that Yates transferred the No. 88 to Hendrick Motorsports for Dale Earnhardt Jr.'s new car. Travis Kvapil would be in the car full-time, with the car switching to No. 28 in the 2008 season, 20 years since the Yates family took over Ranier-Lundy Racing.

Car No. 88 results

Car No. 98 history 
Stephen Leicht (2006)
The No. 98 car debuted in 2006 as the No. 90 Ford sponsored by Citigroup. Stephen Leicht would make the team's first race at Pocono Raceway, starting 36th and finishing 33rd. They also attempted the Brickyard 400 with Leicht but failed to qualify.

Paul Menard (2009)
In 2009, Paul Menard would drive with sponsorship from his father's company Menards. Menard did not finish higher than 13th and finished 31st in points. For 2010, this team became part of Richard Petty Motorsports as the team transitioned to running with Ford from Dodge.

Winston Cup driver history
 Davey Allison (1989–1993)
 Robby Gordon
 Lake Speed (1993)
 Ernie Irvan
 Kenny Wallace
 Dale Jarrett (1995–2006)
 Kenny Irwin Jr. (1998–1999)
 Ricky Rudd (2000–2002, 2007)
 Elliott Sadler (2003–2006)
 Jason Jarrett (2003)
 Stephen Leicht (2006)
 Marc Goossens (2006)
 David Gilliland (2006–2008)
 Mike Wallace
 Travis Kvapil (2008–2009)
 Paul Menard (2009)

Xfinity Series

Car No. 90 history 

Multiple drivers (2005-2006)
The No. 90 car would debut in the 2005 season sponsored by Citifinancial being split by Yates' former NEXTEL Cup drivers Elliott Sadler and Dale Jarrett. The team ran a part-time schedule that season, finishing thirtieth in points, with Jarrett and Sadler posting a combined total of six top-fives. In 2006, Sadler shared the ride with development drivers Stephen Leicht and Matt McCall with Marc Goossens driving on road courses. The team remained in 30th in the standings, and McCall and Goossens were let go from the team.

Stephen Leicht (2006-2007)
Leicht was named full-time driver of the No. 90 in 2007, and picked up his first win at Kentucky Speedway. This team did not run in 2008 due to sponsorship issues and was sold to Germain Racing, where Mike Wallace drove in 2008 as the #7 Geico Toyota. The No. 90 team has not run since.

Car No. 98 history 

Paul Menard (2009)
In 2009, the team returned as the No. 98 Menards Ford driven by Paul Menard part-time and had four top-ten finishes with a highest finish of fifth at Texas Motor Speedway and finished twenty-fifth in points. The No. 98 was then given to Roush Fenway Racing after the 2009 NASCAR Nationwide Series season.

Partnerships

Newman/Haas/Lanigan Racing
During the race weekend of the Allstate 400 at the Brickyard, Robert Yates announced a technological partnership with the Champ Car World Series team Newman/Haas/Lanigan Racing. Yates formed this partnership primarily for technology purposes and with the team's association with the Ford Motor Company, former engine supplier for the CCWS. However, with the retirement of Robert Yates at the end of the 2007 season, this partnership was canceled. The partnership got as far as Newman/Haas/Lanigan acquiring a car.

Hall of Fame Racing
On January 13, 2009 it was announced that former Joe Gibbs Racing satellite team Hall of Fame Racing would enter a technical alliance with Yates Racing. This partnership involved the switch of the #96 from Toyota to Ford, as well as the #96 being run out of Yates Racing's shop. It was also announced that Bobby Labonte would drive the car with sponsorship from search engine Ask.com, inheriting the owners points of Yates Racing's defunct #38 car. The partnership dissolved after the season due to Yates' restructuring, by which point Labonte had been replaced with Roush Fenway Racing developmental driver Erik Darnell.

Front Row Motorsports with Yates Racing
In January 2010 Front Row Motorsports and owner Bob Jenkins formed a partnership with Doug Yates to help him field Fords for the 2010 season.  Doug Yates also took owner points that were earned in 2009 from cars #96 and #98 and transferred them to Front Row Motorsports cars #37 and #38.

References 

1989 establishments in North Carolina
American auto racing teams
Companies based in North Carolina
Defunct NASCAR teams
Auto racing teams established in 1989
Auto racing teams disestablished in 2009